Jacques Pellen (9 April 1957 – 21 April 2020) was a French jazz guitarist. Pellen worked with many musicians over the years such as Peter Gritz, Kenny Wheeler, Bruno Nevez, Henri Texier, Riccardo Del Fra, and violinist Didier Lockwood.

He died from COVID-19 during the COVID-19 pandemic in France on 21 April 2020, at Brest hospital.

References

External links
 

1957 births
2020 deaths
21st-century French musicians
French jazz guitarists
20th-century French musicians
20th-century French male musicians
20th-century guitarists
21st-century French male musicians
21st-century guitarists
French male guitarists
Musicians from Brest, France
Deaths from the COVID-19 pandemic in France